Sparda Bank Hessen Stadium is a stadium in Offenbach am Main, Germany. It became the new home of Kickers Offenbach, when it replaced the club's former home Stadion am Bieberer Berg. The first game played on the ground was a pre-season friendly between Kickers and Bayer 04 Leverkusen on 18 July 2012, with more than 15,000 fans attending.

The stadium is also a regular host to the Germany national rugby union team's games.

References

Football venues in Germany
Sport in Offenbach am Main
Kickers Offenbach
Sports venues in Hesse
Buildings and structures in Offenbach am Main